Linda Dolores Cardozo OBE is a British gynaecologist and professor of urogynaecology at King's College Hospital, London.

Biography 
Cardozo was educated at Haberdashers' Aske's School for Girls until December 1968, and subsequently graduated from the University of Liverpool in 1974 with an MB ChB and received her MD in 1979. From 1995 she has held the position of President of the Association of Chartered Physiotherapists in Women's Health. She has written and published books on obstetrics and gynaecology.

In September 2007 she spoke out against the growing popularity of cosmetic vaginal surgery, saying little evidence exists to advise women on the safety or effectiveness of procedures.

In 2013 she received a lifetime achievement award from the International Urogynaecological Association. She was appointed Officer of the Order of the British Empire (OBE) in the 2014 New Year Honours for services to urogynaecology and women's health. In 2016 she received an Doctor Honoris Causa from the University of Athens.

References

External links 
 http://www.lindacardozo.com/

Year of birth missing (living people)
Living people
British gynaecologists
British medical writers
Women medical writers
English women medical doctors
Officers of the Order of the British Empire
Alumni of the University of Liverpool
People educated at Haberdashers' Girls' School
Women gynaecologists